Marc Shell, born 1947 in Montreal, is a Canadian literary critic. He has interests in nationalism and kinship. He serves as  Babbitt Professor of Comparative Literature and Professor of English at Harvard University. Over 5 of his publications have each been cited over 100 times.

Education
Shell studied at McGill University and Trinity College, Cambridge, and earned a B.A. from Stanford University and a Ph.D. from Yale University. Before Harvard, he taught at The State University of New York (Buffalo) and the University of Massachusetts (Amherst). Shell received a MacArthur Fellowship.

"New Economic Criticism"
Shell is one of the forerunners, along with Jean-Joseph Goux and others, of the literary-critical movement that has been dubbed 'New Economic Criticism  '. His contributions to the study of relations between linguistic and literary economies are encompassed in several books,

 The Economy of Literature (Johns Hopkins University Press 1978).
 Money, Language, and Thought: Literary and Philosophical Economies from the Medieval to the Modern Era (UC Berkeley 1982).
 Art and Money (University of Chicago Press 1995).

Forthcoming works in this area include the following: 
 Wampum and the Origin of American Money (University of Illinois Press, 2013).
 The Painting in the Trash Bin: Otis Kaye and the Perplexities of Art (Chicago, forthcoming).
 The End of Kinship: "Measure for Measure," Incest, and the Ideal of Universal Siblinghood (Stanford 1988).
 Children of the Earth: Literature, Politics, and Nationhood (Oxford 1993).
 Elizabeth's Glass:  With "The Glass of the Sinful Soul" (1544) by Elizabeth I and "Epistle Dedicatory" and "Conclusion" (1548) by John Bale (Nebraska 1995).

Multilingualism: Shell is the co-founder of Harvard's Longfellow Institute, which is devoted to the study of Non-English American literatures, relevant books about translation, language policy and bilingualism that include:

 The Multilingual Anthology of American Literature (NYU ed. 2000)
 American Babel:  Literatures of the United States from Abnaki to Zuni (Harvard ed. 2002)

Disability studies: Shell's books in disability studies include works about paralysis and stuttering.

 Polio and its Aftermath (Harvard 2005)
 Stutter (Harvard 2006)

 Canada and the United States: Shell's writings about Canada and the United States include:

 French-Canadian / American Literary Relations (McGill French Canada Studies Centre 1968)
 Grand Manan: or, A Short History of North America (McGill-Queens 2015 forthcoming)

References

External  links
Marc Shell

1947 births
Living people
Canadian expatriate academics in the United States
Canadian literary critics
Disability studies academics
Harvard University faculty
MacArthur Fellows
University at Buffalo faculty
Alumni of Trinity College, Cambridge
McGill University alumni
Yale University alumni
State University of New York faculty
University of Massachusetts Amherst faculty
Stanford University alumni